Beverly Historic District is a national historic district located at Beverly, Randolph County, West Virginia.  It encompasses 51 contributing buildings that reflect the history of Beverly from its founding to the end of the 19th century. Notable buildings include the Randolph County Courthouse (1808–1894; 1896–1900), old Randolph County Jail (1813–1841), Randolph County Jail (1841), Beverly Public Square (1787), Beverly Cemetery (1768), Beverly Presbyterian Church (1869), Beverly United Methodist Church (1890), Home of "The Enterprise" (c. 1800), and the Peter Buckey House and Hotel (1790–1865).  Also located in the district is the separately listed Blackman-Bosworth Store.

It was listed on the National Register of Historic Places in 1980, and increased in size in 2014.

References

Historic districts on the National Register of Historic Places in West Virginia
National Register of Historic Places in Randolph County, West Virginia
Neoclassical architecture in West Virginia
Federal architecture in West Virginia
Georgian Revival architecture in West Virginia
Historic districts in Randolph County, West Virginia